Cassia typically refers to cassia bark, the spice made from the bark of East Asian evergreen trees.

Cassia may also refer to:

Plants
Cinnamon trees
 Cinnamomum cassia (ròuguì), the cassia or Chinese cinnamon, found in southern China and Indochina
 Other East Asian species of Cinnamomum, such as Cinnamomum burmannii (Indonesian cinnamon) and C. loureiroi, Saigon cinnamon

Osmanthus
 Osmanthus fragrans (guìhuā), is the osmanthus or sweet olive found in southern China and Indochina

Beans
 Cassia (genus), a genus of trees and shrubs in the bean family Fabaceae.
 Senna (plant), a genus of the bean family Fabaceae including species formerly treated in the genus Cassia, and used in herbal medicine:
 Senna obtusifolia, the Chinese senna or sicklepod
 Senna artemisioides, silver cassia or feathery cassia
 Vachellia farnesiana, another member of Fabaceae

Food
 Cassia gum, a food additive made from the seeds of Senna obtusifolia
 Cassia tea or senna tea, an herbal tea made from the seeds of Senna obtusifolia
 Carao syrup, or molasses, is made from boiling down bean pods of Cassia grandis, (Spanish: carao). It is a nutritious sweetener.

People
 Cassia (name)
 Cassia gens

Places
 Cássia, a city in Minas Gerais, Brazil
 Cassia County, Idaho
 Cassia Creek, in the Mining regions of Idaho
 Via Cassia, a Roman road
 Bandar Cassia, the 3rd satellite city of Penang, Malaysia

Other uses
 Cassia flask, a laboratory flask
 Cassia (band)

See also
 Cassiar (disambiguation)
 Cassio (disambiguation)
 Cassius (disambiguation)
 Cassiane (born 1972), Brazilian gospel singer
 Kassia, Byzantine saint and hymnographer